The 2021 Republic of Tuva head election took place on 17–19 September 2021, on common election day, coinciding with election to the State Duma. Acting Head Vladislav Khovalyg was elected for his first full term.

Background
Sholban Kara-ool headed the Republic of Tuva for 14 years, from 2007-2021. He was previously Chairman of the Great Khural of Tuva in 1998-2002 before running in 2002 Tuva presidential election and losing to incumbent President Sherig-ool Oorzhak. Kara-ool won his last gubernatorial election in 2016 with 85.66% of the vote. On 7 April 2021 Sholban Kara-ool asked President Vladimir Putin for his resignation, the move was long expected due to Kara-ool's longevity of service and republic's weak development. Putin accepted Kara-ool's resignation and appointed Vladislav Khovalyg as acting Head of Tuva, Khovalyg previously served as general director of "Tyvaenergosbyt" (main regional electricity provider) in 2018-2021 and Mayor of Kyzyl in 2008-2018. Sholban Kara-ool was appointed as deputy general director of RusHydro and then announced his participation in State Duma election.

Candidates
Only political parties can nominate candidates for head election in Tuva, self-nomination is not possible. However, a candidate is not obliged to be a member of the nominating party. Candidates for Head of the Republic of Tuva should be a Russian citizen and at least 30 years old. Candidates for Head should not have a foreign citizenship or residence permit. In order to be registered, each candidate is required to collect at least 9% of signatures of members and heads of municipalities (134-140 signatures). Also head candidates present 3 candidacies to the Federation Council and election winner later appoints one of the presented candidates.

Registered candidates
Vladimir Chesnokov (Communists of Russia), acting Vice Chairman of the Kaa-Khem Administration for Livelihood and Public Utilities
Aylanmaa Kan-ool (The Greens), director of Kyzyl College of Art
Vladislav Khovalyg (United Russia), acting Head - Chairman of the Government of the Republic of Tuva, former Mayor of Kyzyl (2008-2018), 2016 head candidate in the primary
Andrey Sat (Party of Growth), former Tuva Commissioner for Entrepreneurs' Rights (2014-2020)
Choygana Seden-ool (CPRF), teacher at Dus-Dag Middle School

Failed to qualify
Oleg Ponomarenko (Cossack Party of the Russian Federation), former acting general director of "Tyvaenergosbyt" (2016-2018)
Viktor Popov (LDPR), former Member of the Great Khural of Tuva (2019-2020)

Declined
Arat Mongush, former Kyzyl chief of police
Andrian Oorzhak (LDPR), former Member of the Great Khural of Tuva (2006-2020), son of former Tuva President Sherig-ool Oorzhak
Vasily Oyun (SR-ZP), former Speaker of the Legislative Assembly of the Great Khural of Tuva (2002-2009)

Candidates for the Federation Council
TBA

Finances
All sums are in rubles.

Results

|- style="background-color:#E9E9E9;text-align:center;"
! style="text-align:left;" colspan=2| Candidate
! style="text-align:left;"| Party
! width="75"|Votes
! width="30"|%
|-
| style="background-color:;"|
| style="text-align:left;"| Vladislav Khovalyg (incumbent)
| style="text-align:left;"| United Russia
| 142,159
| 86.81
|-
| style="background-color:;"|
| style="text-align:left;"| Choygana Seden-ool
| style="text-align:left;"| Communist Party
| 6,623
| 4.04
|-
| style="background-color:;"|
| style="text-align:left;"| Aylanmaa Kan-ool
| style="text-align:left;"| The Greens
| 5,617
| 3.43
|-
| style="background-color:;"|
| style="text-align:left;"| Vladimir Chesnokov
| style="text-align:left;"| Communists of Russia
| 4,204
| 2.57
|-
| style="background-color:;"|
| style="text-align:left;"| Andrey Sat
| style="text-align:left;"| Party of Growth
| 3,312
| 2.02
|-
| style="text-align:left;" colspan="3"| Valid votes
| 161,915
| 98.87
|-
| style="text-align:left;" colspan="3"| Blank ballots
| 1,851
| 1.13
|- style="font-weight:bold"
| style="text-align:left;" colspan="3"| Total
| 163,766
| 100.00
|-
| style="background-color:#E9E9E9;" colspan="6"|
|-
| style="text-align:left;" colspan="3"| Turnout
| 163,766
| 82.76
|-
| style="text-align:left;" colspan="3"| Registered voters
| 197,874
| 100.00
|-
| colspan="5" style="background-color:#E9E9E9;"|
|- style="font-weight:bold"
| colspan="4" |Source:
|
|}

Incumbent Senator Lyudmila Narusova (Independent) was re-appointed to the Federation Council.

References

Tuva
September 2021 events in Russia
Politics of Tuva